Maxposure Media Group, stylized as MaXposure Media, is Asia's largest Content Marketing company in the genres of lifestyle, luxury, travel, hospitality, retail, enthusiasts, automobile, aviation, entertainment and real estate. It offers magazines, digital content, video, social media, mobile apps, augmented realty, A.I., promotions and events. It was founded by Vikas Johari and Jorge Arauz in Coral Gables, Florida. The CEO & Managing Director is Prakash Johari. Maxposure has offices throughout the world with headquarters in the United States, and offices in Singapore, Malaysia, Korea, Bangladesh, India, United Arab Emirates.

History

Foundation
Maxposure Media Group was incorporated in Coral Gables, Florida in 2006 by Vikas Johari and Editor-in-Chief & Editorial Director Jorge Arauz. The first office was set up at 1111 Lincoln Road, South Beach, Miami. The pilot issue of the flagship magazine, ANDpersand (a.k.a. &) was created from a dorm room at the University of Miami, where Johari and Arauz studied. Later that summer, Maxposure entered India with the incorporation of Maxposure Media Group (India) Pvt. Ltd. in New Delhi. In Fall of 2006, an Indian edition of ANDpersand was launched as a quarterly in Mumbai.

Expansion

2006 - 2011 
In addition to ANDpersand, Maxposure Media Group has launched various publications in different genres including AndMore (fashion & style), Forms (interior design & architecture) and The BEAT (city & lifestyle). The company has in-house creative agency MaXcom; online outsourcing division Maxposure Digital; and events division Equator.

In August 2009, the company began publishing SpiceRoute for SpiceJet Airlines. The in-flight magazine was the second contract publishing project for the company after Beyond Luxury. and in October 2009, Maxposure Media Group launched the Indian edition of Italian hair & beauty magazine Estetica. It marked the magazine's 25th international edition.

In June 2010, Maxposure Media Group acquired the license for the Indian edition of FHM from Next Gen Publishing Ltd. and Bauer Media Group in the United Kingdom. Maxposure Media Group (India) released its first issue of FHM in August 2010 with Lisa Haydon on the cover. FHM is the UK's largest men's lifestyle media brand. In July 2010, it launched Touchdown and the Indian edition of Mercedes Magazine. The former is the official magazine of the Mumbai International Airport and published for GVK. Mercedes Magazine is published exclusively for Mercedes-Benz India customers and was launched by Vidya Balan & Dr. Wilfried Aulbur, Managing Director & CEO, Mercedes-Benz India. In September 2010, MaXposure acquired the rights to publish Elite Life for ICICI Prudential customers.

in July 2011, MaXposure Media Group launched Diabetic Living, under license from Meredith Corporation. Further in August 2011, Maxposure began publishing the in-flight magazine for Air India, India's oldest and largest airline. The publication rebranded as Shubh Yatra. It features editorial coverage in both English and Hindi and reaches more than 2.5 million readers monthly. The acquisition positioned Maxposure as India's largest in-flight magazine publisher and the largest custom media publisher in India.

Gruner + Jahr (Bertelsmann) Acquisition & Buyback 
On July 1, 2011, the European media conglomerate Gruner + Jahr acquired a 78.75% interest in Maxposure Media Group. Prakash Johari continued to own 21.25% in the company.

During the Gruner + Jahr era, Maxposure added two Axis Bank magazines called Ascend and Homecoming, City Walker for Select Citywalk, Crossing Insights for Crossings Republik, Credai Times for Credai, Nissan Magazine for Nissan Motor India Private Limited, Smart Trucking for Daimler India Commercial Vehicles, Milestones for Ashok Leyland, Watts Up! for Havells, Circle Magazine for Lifestyle Stores, Pantaloons Magazine for Pantaloons Fashion & Retail, Promenade for DLF Promenade, Ambience for Ambience Malls, FDCI Dailies for Fashion Design Council of India, Isuzu Travelogue for Isuzu Motors India  and India Perspective for the Ministry of External Affairs (India)

On December 5, 2014, the founders bought back their stake from Gruner + Jahr for Rs 40 Crore.

Content Marketing, Inflight Entertainment Content Service Provider, and Content Distribution Business 
I. Content Marketing

In March 2015, Maxposure sold its consumer magazines portfolio to focus entirely on content marketing & inflight entertainment content services. In November 2015, Maxposure was awarded the contract for Indian Railways project Rail Bandhu. The bi-lingual magazine is available onboard Shatabdi, Rajdhani and Duronto trains across India. The content was made available on the railway's web portal and mobile app launches and corresponding social media extensions.

Since 2015, Maxposure has been producing in-flight publications and content marketing initiatives for airlines and airports around the world including Vistara, a joint venture between Tata Sons Limited and Singapore Airlines Limited (SIA); Trujetter for regional TruJet Airlines based out of Hyderabad; GoGetter for GoAir; FLY Smiles for Bangalore-based airline Air Pegasus; Gulf Life for Gulf Air, the national carrier of Kingdom of Bahrain; Nawras for Air Arabia, the Sharjah-headquartered United Arab Emirates national budget airline with over 101 destinations in 32 countries worldwide; and AirAsia India's Travel 3Sixty, a joint venture between AirAsia Berhad & Tata Sons. The company continues to expand content marketing projects with The Oberoi Group, ITC Hotels, Taj Hotels and SalamAir across India & the Gulf Cooperation Council. On August 26, 2019, Maxposure was awarded the duties to transform its retail catalogue (Hello 6E)  into a full-fledged in-flight magazine by IndiGo. The launch issue of the new avatar was launched in October 2019.

Inline with the new vision, Maxposure was awarded the several marquee clients to its portfolio since 2018 for its content marketing services.

Ministry of Tourism (India)'s Incredible India portal where the company produces content in over 18 different Indian & foreign languages

Ministry of External Affairs (India)'s India Perspective portal where the company produces content in around 12 foreign languages

Uttarakhand Tourism for the state tourism website, social media and digital marketing campaigns

Madhya Pradesh Tourism for the state tourism website, social media and digital marketing campaigns

IIT Madras for its content marketing requirements

II. Inflight Entertainment Content Service Provider

Aeroplay Entertainment, Content Service Provider(CSP) is headquartered in Singapore and its TPN Certified Lab facility is located in Mumbai & US operations located in New York. Its clients include Jazeera Airways, Air Arabia, Malaysia Airlines, Air India, Kuwait Airways, Yemenia to name. It is now one of the fastest growing CSP in the world.

III. Content Distribution Business

Alpha Pictures is content (Movies, TV Shows, Destination Videos & Guides)  distribution arm of Maxposure. It focuses on Indian Content (Bollywood, Regional), Arabic Content and Destination Videos (Major cities around the world).

References 

Magazine publishing companies of India